What Are You On? is an album by East River Pipe, released in 2006.

Track listing
"What Does T.S. Eliot Know About You?" – 2:30
"Crystal Queen" – 2:29
"What Are You On?" – 2:02
"I'll Walk My Robot Home" – 3:09
"The Ultrabright Bitch" – 2:07
"Druglife" – 3:49
"Absolutely Nothing" – 2:12
"Dirty Carnival" – 3:06
"You Got Played, Little Girl" – 2:09
"Life Is a Landfill" – 2:57
"Shut Up and Row" – 2:17
"Trivial Things" – 2:25
"Some Dreams Can Kill You" – 5:19

References

2006 albums
East River Pipe albums